This is the list of people inducted into the Billiard Congress of America's hall of fame to honour outstanding people who, through their competitive skills and dedication, have enriched the sport and industry. Two categories have been established in the Billiard Congress of America's Hall of Fame. The "Greatest Player" category is awarded for outstanding players who must be 40 years of age or older, have been active professionals for at least 15 years and have recorded significant achievements in national or international competition recognized by the BCA. The "Meritorious Service" category (•) is awarded for those who have made lasting, memorable and important contributions to the game or the billiards industry.

The year of induction is listed after the name.

1966–1969

Ralph Greenleaf (1966)
 Willie Hoppe (1966)
 Charle Peterson (1966) •
 Welker Cochran (1967)
 Alfredo de Oro (1967)
 Ben Nartzik (1967) •
 Jake Schaefer Sr. (1968)
 Jake Schaefer Jr. (1968)
 Willie Mosconi (1968)
 Herman Rambow (1969) •

1970–1979

 Harold Worst (1970)
 John Hyatt (1971) •
 Johnny Layton (1974)
 Frank Taberski (1975)
 Jimmy Caras (1977)
 Irving Crane (1978)

1980–1989

Steve Mizerak (1980)
 Dorothy Wise (1981)
 Joe Balsis (1982)
 Luther Lassiter (1983)
 Minnesota Fats (1984) •
 Jean Balukas (1985)
 Lou Butera (1986)
 Erwin Rudolph (1987)
 Andrew Ponzi (1988)
 Mike Sigel (1989)

1990–1999

 John Brunswick (1990) •
 Walter Tevis (1991) •
 Nick Varner (1992)
 Michael Phelan (1993) •
 Eddie Taylor (1993)
 Ray Martin (1994)
 Jimmy Moore (1994)
 Cisero Murphy (1995)
 Dallas West (1996)
 Arthur Cranfield (1997)
 Ruth McGinnis (1997)
 Larry Johnson (1999)

2000–2009

 Buddy Hall (2000)
 Robert Byrne (2001) •
 Raymond Ceulemans (2001)
 LoreeJon Brown (2002)
 Jim Rempe (2002)
 Ed Kelly (2003)
 Efren Reyes (2003)
 Ewa Laurance (2004)
 George Balabushka (2004) •
 Mike Massey (2005) •
 Robin Dodson (2005)
 Earl Strickland (2006)
 Sang Lee (2007)
 Allen Hopkins (2008)
 Pat Fleming (2008) •
 Johnny Archer  (2009)
 Allison Fisher (2009)

2010–2019

Francisco Bustamante (2010)
Terry Bell (2010) •
Larry Hubbart (2010) •
Ralf Souquet (2011)
Danny DiLiberto (2011)
Karen Corr (2012)
Jeanette Lee (2013)
Barry Hearn (2013) •
Jose Parica (2014)
Mika Immonen (2014)
Oliver Ortmann (2014)
Charles Ursitti (2015) •
Rodney Morris (2016) 
Belinda Calhoun (2016)
Tom Rossman (2017) •
Darren Appleton (2017)
Gerda Hofstatter (2018) 
Kim Davenport (2018)
Greg Sullivan (2019) •
Paul Jansco (2019) •
George Jansco (2019) •
Alex Pagulayan (2019)

2020–2022

Kelly Fisher (2020)
Thorsten Hohmann (2021)
Jerry Briesath (2022) •
Dennis Orcollo (2022)

References

"The BCA Hall of Fame", Billiard Congress of America, Colorado Springs, Colorado, USA; accessed 11 July 2008

External links
 

Halls of fame in Colorado
Sports halls of fame